Ian Tregillis is an American author. He is the author of the alternate history trilogy The Milkweed Triptych and a contributor to George R. R. Martin's Wild Cards series. He is an alumnus of the Clarion Workshop, and holds a Ph.D in physics.

Bibliography

The Alchemy Wars
 The Mechanical (2015)
 The Rising (2015)
 The Liberation (2016)

The Milkweed Triptych
 Bitter Seeds (2010)
 The Coldest War (2012)
 Necessary Evil (2013)

Serial fiction 
 The Witch Who Came in from the Cold (co-created by Max Gladstone and Lindsay Smith)
 The Witch Who Came in from the Cold Season One (with Lindsay Smith, Max Gladstone, Cassandra Rose Clarke, and Michael Swanwick)
 Episode 5: "The Golem" (2016)
 Episode 7: "Radio Free Trismegistus" (forthcoming, 2016)
 Episode 11: "King's Gambit Accepted" (forthcoming, 2016)

Other novels
 Something More Than Night (2013, Tor Books)

References

External links

 REVIEW : Necessary Evil
 Story behind Milkweed Triptych — Essay
 Ian Tregillis at RT Book Reviews

Living people
American science fiction writers
American male novelists
21st-century American novelists
American alternate history writers
Novelists from Minnesota
University of Minnesota College of Science and Engineering alumni
21st-century American male writers
Year of birth missing (living people)